First Kill is an American supernatural teen drama series created by Victoria Schwab that premiered on June 10, 2022 on Netflix. The series is based on Schwab's short story of the same name. In August 2022, the series was canceled after one season.

Premise 
Teenage vampire Juliette Fairmont, having celebrated her sixteenth birthday, needs to make her first kill in order to enter adulthood and take her place among her powerful family of Legacy vampires, matrilineal direct descendants of Lilith who chose to be bitten by the Serpent in the Garden of Eden. Juliette has difficulty choosing someone to feed on and struggles with her growing blood lust as she believes draining humans is wrong. She instead sets her sights romantically on the new girl Calliope Burns. Calliope, who belongs to a monster-hunting family from The Guardian Guild, needs to slay her first monster in order to gain her family's approval and officially become a Hunter herself. As both families become unavoidably involved, and Juliette and Calliope's relationship develops, the girls realize that killing each other is not so simple.

Cast and characters

Main

 Sarah Catherine Hook as Juliette Fairmont
 Imani Lewis as Calliope "Cal" Burns
 Elizabeth Mitchell as Margot, Juliette's mother
 Aubin Wise as Talia, Cal's mother
 Gracie Dzienny as Elinor, Juliette's older sister 
 Dominic Goodman as Apollo, Cal's older brother
 Phillip Mullings, Jr. as Theo, Cal's eldest half-brother
 Jason R. Moore as Jack, Cal's father

Recurring

 Will Swenson as Sebastian, Margot's formerly human husband
 Jonas Dylan Allen as Ben Wheeler, Juliette's best friend
 MK xyz as Tess Franklin, Cal's best friend
 Joseph D. Reitman as Clayton Cook
 Christopher B. Duncan as Principal Waters
 Walnette Santiago as Carmen
 Polly Draper as Davina Atwood, Margot's mother and ruler of the Legacy vampires
 Dylan McNamara as Oliver, Juliette's older brother and Elinor's twin brother
In addition, Roberto Méndez co-stars as Noah Harrington.

Episodes

Production

Development

On October 15, 2020, Netflix gave the production a series order consisting of eight one-hour long episodes. The series is created by Victoria Schwab who also executive produced alongside Felicia D. Henderson, Emma Roberts, and Karah Preiss. First Kill is based on Schwab's short story of the same name. Schwab and Henderson co-wrote the episodes. It is the first production from Roberts and Preiss's Belletrist Productions company. On April 21, 2021, it was reported that Jet Wilkinson is set to direct the first two episodes of the series. The series was released on June 10, 2022. On August 2, 2022, Netflix canceled the series after one season.

Casting
On March 10, 2021, Sarah Catherine Hook and Imani Lewis were cast to star. On May 27, 2021, Elizabeth Mitchell, Aubin Wise, Jason R. Moore, Gracie Dzienny, Will Swenson, Phillip Mullings, Jr., Dominic Goodman, Dylan McNamara, MK xyz, Jonas Dylan Allen, and Roberto Mendez joined the main cast.

Filming
Production was scheduled to begin in late 2021 in Savannah, Georgia.

Reception

The review aggregator website Rotten Tomatoes reports a 61% approval rating and an average rating of 5.8/10 based on 21 critic reviews. The website's critics consensus reads, "This sapphic soap about vampiric love is earnest enough to put a stake through the hearts of the genre faithful, but its clumsy execution leaves an aftertaste that's more garlicky than sweet." Metacritic, which uses a weighted average, assigned a score of 45 out of 100 based on 8 critics, indicating "mixed or average reviews".

In its first three days on Netflix, the show was watched globally for 30.34 million hours. After a month the show was watched upwards of over 100 million viewing hours peaking at number 3 in the Top 10 list for English speaking TV Shows.

IndieWire listed it as one of the 31 best vampire TV shows and called it schlocky and predictable but "fun if you let it be". Essence described it as a mash-up of Romeo and Juliet, The Vampire Diaries, and "a relatable coming-of-age love story".

Renewal efforts
A month after cancellation by Netflix, fans around the world have continued efforts to get the series renewed or moved to a different streaming service. The social media outcry was taken by observers as proof that there is a popular market for LGBTQ+ TV shows with queer characters and their stories in the same style as Riverdale. First Kill resonated with some fans because it is a queer storyline with Black representation and is on a list of fan favorites that Netflix cancelled. The show has been compared on a must watch list to other fan favorite shows like Fate: The Winx Saga because the focus is on young girls with mystical capabilities. First Kills showrunner has hope that the series will get renewed because of fans' efforts. Us Weekly included First Kill in a list of shows canceled too soon in November 2022.

References

External links
 
 

2020s American LGBT-related drama television series
2020s American supernatural television series
2020s American teen drama television series
2022 American television series debuts
2022 American television series endings
Cultural depictions of Adam and Eve
English-language Netflix original programming
Lesbian-related television shows
Television series about teenagers
Television series about vampires
Television shows filmed in Georgia (U.S. state)
Television shows set in Savannah, Georgia